Bipolar and Proud is a 2004 album released by country music parodist Cledus T. Judd. The album was originally slated to be named "Cledus Gone Wild", but was changed at the last minute. This album also produced his highest chart single in "I Love NASCAR", which charted at 48 on the Hot Country Songs charts.

David Jefferies of Allmusic rated the album three-and-a-half stars out of five, saying that most of the tracks were funny, but criticizing " Is Funny".

It is also an enhanced CD, featuring the video for the song "I Love NASCAR".

Track listing
Original content on parody songs written by Cledus T. Judd and Chris Clark, except "Bake Me a Country Ham", parody lyrics by Corey Lee Barker and Lee Gibson. Composers of original songs as noted.
"I Love NASCAR" — 4:07
parody of "I Love This Bar" by Toby Keith (Toby Keith, Scotty Emerick)
feat. Toby Keith
"Hell No" — 4:22
parody of "Hell Yeah" by Montgomery Gentry (Jeffrey Steele, Craig Wiseman)
"One Jack Off" (Judd, Clark, Paula Taylor) — 3:41
original song
"Paycheck Woman" — 3:21
parody of "Redneck Woman" by Gretchen Wilson (Gretchen Wilson, John Rich)
"Bake Me a Country Ham" — 3:44
parody of "Paint Me a Birmingham" by Tracy Lawrence (Buck Moore, Gary Duffy)
"I'm Going Ugly Early Tonight" (Brent Burns, Bill Whyte, Pete Hourihan) — 3:03
original song
" Is Funny" (Jim Beavers, Mike Waldron) — 3:20
original song
"Starkissed" (Keith, Emerick) — 2:55
original song
"Martie, Emily & Natalie" — 3:31
parody of "Celebrity" by Brad Paisley (Brad Paisley)
"Funny Man" (Clark) — 4:04
original song

Personnel
Compiled from liner notes.
 Ricky Barker — background vocals on "I'm Going Ugly Early Tonight"
 Jim Beavers — background vocals on " Is Funny"
 Trenna Barnes — background vocals on "Paycheck Woman" and "One Jack Off"
 Dennis Burnside — keyboards on "Hell No" and "Funnyman"
 Glen Duncan — fiddle, mandolin
 Pat Flynn — acoustic guitar
 Wes Hightower — background vocals on "I Love NASCAR" and "Hell No"
 Doug Kahan — bass guitar
 Troy Lancaster — electric guitar
 Russ Pahl — electric guitar, pedal steel guitar
 Larry Paxton — bass guitar
 Marcia Ramirez — background vocals on " Is Funny"
 John Wesley Ryles — background vocals on "One Jack Off", "Bake Me a Country Ham", "I'm Going Ugly Early Tonight", "Starkissed" and "Funnyman"
 Scott Sanders — pedal steel guitar, lap steel guitar
 Paul Scholten — drums, percussion
 Mike Severs — electric guitar
 Steve Sheehan — acoustic guitar
 Gary Smith — keyboards
 Mike Waldron — background vocals on " Is Funny"

Charts

References

2004 albums
Cledus T. Judd albums
E1 Music albums
2000s comedy albums